Purvesh Sarnaik (born 28 December 1991) is an Indian politician, film producer and businessperson from the Indian state of Maharashtra, affiliated with Shiv Sena. Currently, he is serving as the Secretary of Yuva Sena, the youth wing of Shiv Sena. He was elected as corporator to the Thane Municipal Corporation in February 2017. He is the son of MLA Pratap Sarnaik and son in law of Ranjit Patil.

He is one of the founders of Youngberry Entertainment and has produced two Marathi films, Kanha, which was released in 2016 and Hrudayantar, released in 2017.

Positions held

Filmography

Personal life 
He married Kashmira Patil, daughter of BJP leader and cabinet minister Ranjit Patil in May 2019.

His marriage was attended by Chief Minister Devendra Fadnavis, Uddhav Thackeray, Salman Khan, Jeetendra, Sunil Shetty, Aditya Thackeray, Niranjan Hiranandani, Subhash Desai, Pankaja Munde and Eknath Shinde.

References 

Shiv Sena politicians
Marathi politicians
Maharashtra politicians
Politicians from Mumbai
Marathi film producers
Film producers from Mumbai
Living people
1991 births